Muradnagar Assembly constituency is one of the 403 constituencies of the Uttar Pradesh Legislative Assembly, India. It is a part of the Ghaziabad district and one of the five assembly constituencies in the Ghaziabad Lok Sabha constituency. First election in this assembly constituency was held in 1967 after the "Delimitation order" was passed and the constituency was constituted in 1967. The constituency was assigned identification number 54 after the "Delimitation of Parliamentary and Assembly Constituencies Order, 2008" was passed.

Wards / Areas
Extent of Muradnagar Assembly constituency is KC Muradnagar and Muradnagar MB of Modinagar Tehsil; PCs Duhai, Ataur, Shamsher, Sadarpur, Bahadurpur of Ghaziabad KC, Ward Nos. 7, 12, 24, 27, 31, 32, 34, 39, 40, 43, 45, 47, 49, 51, 54, 56 & 58 in Ghaziabad (M Corp.) of Ghaziabad Tehsil.

Members of the Legislative Assembly

Election results

2022

2017

16th Vidhan Sabha: 2012 General Elections.

See also
Ghaziabad district, India
Ghaziabad Lok Sabha constituency
Sixteenth Legislative Assembly of Uttar Pradesh
Uttar Pradesh Legislative Assembly

References

External links
 

Assembly constituencies of Uttar Pradesh
Ghaziabad district, India
Constituencies established in 1967
1967 establishments in Uttar Pradesh